Qaraman (also, Karaman) is a village and municipality in the Goychay Rayon of Azerbaijan.  It has a population of 788.

References 

Populated places in Goychay District